The following highways are numbered 859:

United States